Edgar "Edgardo" Batalla Aglipay (born September 13, 1948) is a Filipino businessman and retired police officer with the rank of general. He is the current chairman emeritus of DIWA partylist. He was the Chief of the Philippine National Police (PNP) from August 23, 2004 to March 14, 2005. 

General Aglipay is a relative of revolutionary hero Gregorio Aglipay. In 1972, as a young lieutenant, he was the platoon leader of the raiding team that captured MV Karagatan which prevented the communist insurgents from getting hold of 1,500 M-14 rifles and other high power firearms which if not prevented would have further boosted the communist insurgency in the Philippines. Also, he is a two time chief deputy director-general of the National Capital Region Police Office (NCRPO) from 1998 to 2000 and from 2001 to 2002, his second appointment to the post. He was a member of the Philippine Military Academy class of 1971, and has a Master's of Business Administration (MBA) from the University of the Philippines. In addition, he has a law degree from the Ateneo de Manila University.  After retirement from government service in 2010, he concentrated on his EMME Group of companies, a group of small and medium enterprises focusing on security, logistics and property. He was also honored as a captain of two industries: the trucking industry, as chairman emeritus of Confederation of Truckers Association of the Philippines, and the private security industry, as chairman emeritus of Philippine Association of Detective and Protective Agencies Organization (PADPAO).

Career
In January 2000, Aglipay relieved and assigned replacements for two police chiefs of the cities of Mandaluyong and Pasig, Superintendents Rodolfo Tutaan and Raul Medina respectively, upon the orders of then PNP chief Panfilo Lacson due to the underwhelming and neglectful performance of their subordinates. Multiple mayors of Metro Manila were infuriated with Aglipay's move, claiming that he made his decision without consulting them first, with Marikina Mayor Bayani Fernando being the first to call for his ouster while Jejomar Binay, chairman of the Metropolitan Manila Development Authority (MMDA), led the mayors in pushing for his removal. After a closed-door meeting on January 28 between Binay and the mayors and the pair of Aglipay and Lacson, however, they resolved the controversy and allowed Aglipay to retain his post, with Interior Secretary Alfredo Lim stating that the issue simply came from a "communication gap".

Upon the Second EDSA Revolution in January 2001, Aglipay and the five metropolitan police district directors joined the Armed Forces of the Philippines in withdrawing their support for President Joseph Estrada and going to EDSA, with Aglipay ordering his subordinates to keep the peace and "protect the people" in the area.

Personal life
Nicknamed "Egay", Aglipay is the father of Emmeline Yan Aglipay-Villar, wife of senator-businessman Mark Villar, who is a former Department of Justice Undersecretary and party-list representative.

References

Living people
1948 births
Arroyo administration personnel
Ateneo de Manila University alumni
Filipino business executives
Filipino police chiefs
People from Cagayan
Philippine Military Academy alumni
University of the Philippines alumni
Members of the Philippine Independent Church